Bronkow is a municipality in the Oberspreewald-Lausitz district, in southern Brandenburg, Germany.

History
From 1815 to 1945, Bronkow was part of the Prussian Province of Brandenburg.

From 1952 to 1990, it was part of the Bezirk Cottbus of East Germany.

Demography

References

Populated places in Oberspreewald-Lausitz